The Lichenologist is a peer reviewed scientific journal specializing in lichenology.  It is published bimonthly by the British Lichen Society.  According to the Journal Citation Reports, the 2020 impact factor of The Lichenologist is 1.514, ranking it 149 out of 235 in plant sciences and 26 of 29 in mycology.

More than 51,000 lichen-related articles were published up to 2019, about 4.7% (over 2400) of which were published in The Lichenologist; about half of these were published under the senior editorship of Peter Crittenden, who had a 20-year tenure at the journal, from 2000 to 2020.

References

Cited literature

Botany journals
Publications established in 1958
Bimonthly journals
English-language journals
Mycology